Jover Hernández is a Cuban handball coach who formerly coached the Cuban national team including during the 2015 World Women's Handball Championship.

References

Year of birth missing (living people)
Living people
Cuban handball coaches
Place of birth missing (living people)